Lucky Paul Otofe (born 23 September 1989) is a Nigerian professional footballer who currently plays as a forward. After joining Bulgarian club Shumen in 2014, between the summer of 2016 and February 2018 he was under contract with Vitosha Bistritsa, scoring a goal against Neftochimic Burgas in a playoff match held in June 2017 that secured the team's first ever promotion to the top division of Bulgarian football. Subsequently to leaving Vitosha, Otofe played for Strumska Slava, Germanea and Nadezhda Dobroslavtsi, signing for the latter in July 2019.

References

External links

1989 births
Living people
Nigerian footballers
Association football forwards
FC Vitosha Bistritsa players
FC Strumska Slava Radomir players
First Professional Football League (Bulgaria) players
Second Professional Football League (Bulgaria) players
Nigerian expatriate footballers
Nigerian expatriate sportspeople in Bulgaria
Expatriate footballers in Bulgaria